The 2009 Glastonbury Festival/Glastonbury Festival of Contemporary Performing Arts was held from 24 to 29 June 2009.

Tickets

Registration 
In a similar way to previous festivals, tickets for the 2009 event required pre-registration (of a photograph and personal details) through the festival website. Registration opened on 1 September 2008.

Sales 
Tickets were able to be purchased via the See Tickets website or by telephone. A limited number of tickets were available by promotion through the Western Daily Press and competitions run by Greenpeace, eFestivals and The Guardian.

Ticket lines opened on the morning of 5 October 2008, and customers were able to place deposits for tickets (£50) or buy them in full (£175). Tickets required full payment by 1 February 2009.

On 22 January 2009, at Midem 2009, Michael Eavis announced that 90% of the event's 137,500 tickets had been sold. He also stated that although headliners had not been confirmed, he was awaiting confirmation from the acts he had approached.

Re-sale 
Reserved tickets which did not have their remaining balance paid by the deadline were put back on sale on 2 February 2009 and it was announced the next day that the event had sold out, with the majority of reservations being balanced by 1 February deadline. A re-sale of cancelled tickets was held on 5 April 2009 at 9:00 am. These tickets sold out by 10:15 am.

Site

Arenas 
In a December 2008 interview, co-organiser Emily Eavis stated that the Trash City arena would be expanded for the 2009 festival. On 5 December 2008, Battersea and Wandsworth TUC announced that the Left Field tent of the site would not be a part of the 2009 event. A new area, named William's Green, occupied the same area.
The 2009 event saw expansion of the Dance Village – including a 3D disco – as well as the return of the G-Stage and the Pussy Parlure. Greenpeace used their area in the Green Fields to create an airport terminal building and miniature replica of the village of Sipson, which is threatened by the expansion of London Heathrow Airport.

Camping 
As with previous events, the festival had a tipi field where six people can accommodate one tipi for the shared price of £800.
A new hospitality area, surrounded by a  wall, was created on the old cinema field between Lower Mead and Wicker Ground fields. This area included PodPad camping. 
The positioning of this area restricted pedestrian access to both camping and parking sites; pathways at previous festivals have led through this area.

Line up 
The three main headline acts (Neil Young, Bruce Springsteen & the E Street Band and Blur) were announced in March 2009, with the full line up being released on 25 May 2009.

Stages 1 to 11

Stages 12 to 20

Impact of Michael Jackson's death
The news of Michael Jackson's death spread during the night of 25 June. Various tributes were made to him by performers throughout 26 June, including Dizzee Rascal leading a crowd rendition of Jackson's hit Thriller, and N.E.R.D frontman Pharrell Williams paying respects for Jackson in saying "It's the music, the music was so incredible", before adding that Jackson "changed music and the way people looked at music." Other performers to pay tribute to Jackson included The Streets, Hugh Cornwell, Lily Allen, Dan Le Sac Vs Scroobius Pip and Gabriella Cilmi. Within hours of his death, there were T-shirts for sale proclaiming "I was at Glasto 09 when Jacko died" 
and shops announcing "Michael Jackson has died, 10% off everything."

Swine flu at Glastonbury 2009 
Several cases of swine flu were reported during the festival. Two of these were students and one a 10-year-old child. The three infected festival-goers were isolated when symptoms presented and no further cases have been reported. Festival organisers had reportedly anticipated some cases of the virus with a spokesperson saying "...the figure of three in 177,000 people is regarded as very low."

References

External links

2009
2009 in England
2009 in British music
Gla
June 2009 events in the United Kingdom